Rosaria Conte (14 April 1954 in Rome – 5 July 2016 in Rome) was an Italian social scientist. She was the head of the Laboratory of Agent Based Social Simulation at the ISTC-CNR in Rome, which hosts an interdisciplinary research group working at the intersection among cognitive, social and computational sciences. She was President of European Social Simulation Association and AISC (Italian Cognitive Science Association). Rosaria Conte published more than 130 works among volumes, papers in scientific journals, conference proceedings and book chapters. Her scientific activity aims at explaining social behaviour among intelligent autonomous systems, and modeling the dynamics of norms and norm-enforcement mechanisms (including reputation and gossip). Her research was characterized by a highly interdisciplinary approach, at the intersection among cognitive, social and computational sciences. In her name, the European Social Simulation Association assigns every other year the Outstanding Contribution Award for Social Simulation, whose first recipients are Nigel Gilbert and Uri Wilensky.

Career 
Conte was born in Foggia. She studied philosophy at the Sapienza University of Rome. In 1980 she received a Postdoctoral Fellowship at Department of Sociology, UCSD, USA, under the supervision of the sociologist Aaron Cicourel. In 1985 she completed her education with a visiting period at the Department of Psychology of the Johns Hopkins University, Baltimore, USA.

Rosaria Conte's scientific interest focused on Social order, Agent Theory, Emergence and the Evolution of Social institutions, Deontic logic, Social simulation and Cultural evolution. From 1982 to 2001 she was Junior Scientist at the Institute of Psychology (IP, now Institute of Cognitive Science and Technology, ISTC) of Cnr. In 1998 she founded the Laboratory of Agent Based Social Simulation (LABSS), at ISTC-CNR. In the same period she started teaching Social Psychology at the University of Siena.

In 2001 she became Honorary Associate Researcher at Center for Policy Making of Business School, Manchester Metropolitan University, UK. In 2006 she was elected President of AISC (Italian Cognitive Science Association), and in 2008 became President of the European Social Simulation Association. In 2015 she became Vice Head of the Psychology Faculty at the Università telematica internazionale Uninettuno.

Rosaria Conte was Vice President of the Scientific Committee of the National Research Council (Italy) and Member of the Italian National Bioethics Committee. She died in Rome in 2016.

Selected publications 
D. Villatoro, G.Andrighetto, R. Conte, J. Sabater-Mir (2011), Dynamic Sanctioning for Robust and Cost-Efficient Norm Compliance, In Proceedings of the Twenty-Second International Joint Conference on Artificial Intelligence (IJCAI 2011). https://web.archive.org/web/20110930223630/http://www.istc.cnr.it/bibtex.php?id=2669
F. Giardini, R. Conte (2011), Gossip for Social Control in Natural and Artificial Societies, Simulation: Transactions of the Society for Modeling and Simulation International. http://sim.sagepub.com/content/early/2011/05/19/0037549711406912.full.pdf
Andrighetto, G., Villatoro, D., Conte, R (2010). Norm internalization in artificial societies, in AI Communications, pp. 1–15. http://www.deepdyve.com/lp/ios-press/norm-internalization-in-artificial-societies-QwnPbkdiGX
Conte, R. (2010) Rational, Goal-directed Agents. Encyclopedia of Complex Social Systems, Springer, Encyclopedia. https://web.archive.org/web/20110930224157/http://www.istc.cnr.it/bibtex.php?id=2245
Tummolini, L., Andrighetto, G., Castelfranchi, C. & Conte, R. (pres). A convention or (tacit) agreement betwixt us: on reliance and its normative consequences. Synthese.  https://cnr-it.academia.edu/LucaTummolini/Papers/152049/A_convention_or_tacit_agreement_betwixt_us_on_reliance_and_its_normative_consequences
Campennì, M., Cecconi, F., Andrighetto, G., Conte, R., (2010). Norm and Social Compliance A Computational Study. The International Journal of Agent Technologies and Systems (IJATS), 2 (1), 50–62. http://www.igi-global.com/bookstore/article.aspx?titleid=39032

Pitt, J., Conte, R., Dung, P., Sartor, G., Troitzsch, K., Draief, M., Andrighetto, G. (2010). Modular Argumentation and the Dynamics of (Il)Legality: A Position Statement on ICT for Governance and Policy Modelling. Best Contributions on the State of the Art and Future of ICT for Governance and Policy Modelling.  https://web.archive.org/web/20120501094125/http://crossroad.epu.ntua.gr/files/2010/04/13_moduleg.pdf
 
Paolucci M., Conte R. (2009). Reputation: Social Transmission for Partner Selection. In Trajkovski G. P. & Collins S. G. (Eds.), Handbook of Research on Agent-Based Societies: Social and Cultural Interactions (pp. 243–260). Hershey: IGI Publishing. https://web.archive.org/web/20110930224708/http://www.istc.cnr.it/doc/70a_553p_PaolucciConteComplete.pdf
 
 

 

Conte R. (2003). Review of simulating organizations: Computational models of institutions and groups. Journal of Artificial Societies and Social Simulation, N° 6. http://jasss.soc.surrey.ac.uk/6/2/reviews/conte.html

References

External links 
Rosaria Conte's homepage
Laboratory of Agent Based Social Simulation of Istc-Cnr
Italian National Bioethics Committee
Rosaria Conte's citations on Google Scholar

1952 births
2016 deaths
Italian social scientists
People from Foggia
University of California, San Diego alumni
Johns Hopkins University alumni
National Research Council (Italy) people